The national flag of Cyprus came into use on 16 August 1960, under the Zürich and London Agreements, whereby a constitution was drafted and Cyprus was proclaimed an independent state. The flag was designed by artist İsmet Güney. The design of the flag deliberately employs peaceful and neutral symbols in an attempt to indicate harmony between the Greek and Turkish Cypriot communities, an ideal that has not yet been realised. In 1963, Greek Cypriot and Turkish Cypriot communities separated because of Cypriot intercommunal violence.

The national flag features the shape of the entirety of the island, with two olive branches below (a symbol of peace between the island's two communities) on white (another symbol of peace). The olive branches signify peace between the Greek and Turkish Cypriots. The map on the flag is a copper-orange colour, symbolising the large deposits of copper ore on the island, from which it may have received its name.

Creation

The flag of the Republic of Cyprus was preceded by the flag of British Cyprus. Upon independence, Cyprus adopted a new flag. Under the constitution, the flag should “have a neutral design and colour,” i.e. it should not include either blue or red colours (the colours of the flag of Greece and the flag of Turkey), nor portray a cross or a crescent.

The original proposal, made by the former British colonial administration, featured a rust-brown K on a white field. It was rejected by the President Makarios III and Vice-president Fazil Küçük, who preferred a flag proposed by İsmet Güney, a Turkish Cypriot artist.

In the design of August 1960, the colour of the map is copper (Pantone 144-C). Both the crest and the two olive-tree leaves are olive green (Pantone 336-C). The background is white with the 3:5 ratio. In April 2006 the design was updated, the shape of the olive branches were slightly altered, its color was changed to Pantone 574, The copper color of the map was changed to Pantone 1385 and the ratio was changed to 3:2.

Flags produced on Cyprus often differ from the original specifications, both regarding the size of the map and the colours used. The government announced in October 2005, that it would take steps to "start from scratch" and assure that only flags complying with the official specifications would be produced.

Under the constitution of Cyprus, the flag of Cyprus may be flown by state institutions, public corporations, and citizens of the country.

Use of the flags of Greece and Turkey

According to the constitution, the community authorities and their institutions have the right to hoist the Greek flag or the Turkish flag alongside the flag of Cyprus during the holidays. Any citizen may, without any restriction, fly the Greek or Turkish flag, or both, next to the Cypriot flag at their residence or store. Other provisions also allow municipalities, educational institutions and the National Guard to do so as well. Since the de facto division of the island, consecutive to the 1974 invasion, the flag of Greece is the only of the two flown in the area under the jurisdiction of the Republic of Cyprus, due to the predominant presence of Greek-Cypriots in that part of the island. Similarly, the flag of Turkey is only observed in the area under the control of the Turkish Republic of Northern Cyprus (recognised only by Turkey). Lately, only the National Guard, the Ministry of Education, Ministry of Defence and the Municipal authorities of the Republic of Cyprus fly the Greek flag alongside the Cypriot and EU flags.

Colors

Other flags

The flag of the unrecognised Turkish Republic of Northern Cyprus is based on the flag of Turkey, with the colors reversed and two additional horizontal red stripes at the top and bottom. It was designed by Emin Çizenel.

Proposed national flag

Under the terms of the Annan Plan for Cyprus, a United Nations proposal to settle the Cyprus dispute, a new national flag would have been adopted by a reconstituted confederal republic of Cyprus. A competition was announced and the UN collected over 1000 proposals until 17 February 2003. Some of the proposals can be found on the webpage "Cyprus seeks new flag" by the BBC. It is possible that any future Cyprus settlement will include the adoption of a new flag.

The plan was accepted by Turkish Cypriots, but rejected by Greek Cypriots, therefore the plan was not put into place.

Gallery

See also 

 Flag of Greece
 Flag of Northern Cyprus
 Coat of arms of Cyprus
 Hymn to Liberty

References

External links 

 
 Flags in Cyprus
 Cyprus Flag and Emblem  - Cyprus Government Web Portal

 

 
Cyprus
National symbols of Cyprus
Cyprus
Cyprus